Biliary injury (bile duct injury) is the traumatic damage of the bile ducts. It is most commonly an iatrogenic complication of cholecystectomy (surgical removal of the gallbladder), but can also be caused by other operations or by major trauma. The risk of biliary injury is more during laparoscopic cholecystectomy than during open cholecystectomy. Biliary injury may lead to several complications and may even cause death if not diagnosed in time and managed properly. Ideally biliary injury should be managed at a center with facilities and expertise in endoscopy, radiology and surgery.

References

See also 
 Biloma

Biliary tract disorders